The Gesellschaft Nordwest-Kamerun was a private trading corporation formed in 1899 to exploit natural resources in the Bamoun and Bamileke regions of the German colony of Kamerun.

References

See also
Gesellschaft Süd-Kamerun

Trading companies
Kamerun
Companies established in 1899
1899 establishments in the German colonial empire
Trading companies established in the 19th century 
Trading companies of Germany